Willie Davies (born 1955) is a British former professional tennis player.

A native of Southport, Davies was active during the 1970s and 1980s, featuring in doubles main draws at the Wimbledon Championships. He reached a best singles world ranking of 454 and also played collegiate tennis in Louisiana.

References

External links
 
 

1955 births
Living people
British male tennis players
English male tennis players
Tennis people from Merseyside
Louisiana–Monroe Warhawks men's tennis players